John 'Jack' McPherson is an Australian former rugby league footballer who played in the 1940s and 1950s.

Playing career
McPherson was a prop-forward for St. George and played four seasons with the club between 1945-1948, including the 1946 Grand Final. 

He did not play during the 1949 season, but returned in 1950 to play for Eastern Suburbs for two seasons between 1950-1951. A highlight of McPherson's career was possibly his selection as a reserve for Australia for the third test against England in 1946, but he did not take the field.

References

St. George Dragons players
Sydney Roosters players
Australian rugby league players
Year of birth missing (living people)
Possibly living people
Rugby league props
Place of birth missing (living people)